Orchestra is an album by the German double bassist and composer Eberhard Weber, recorded in 1988 and released on the ECM label.

Reception

The AllMusic review by Ron Wynn awarded the album 2 stars, saying, "Glorious sound, little "pure jazz" content though."  

The authors of The Penguin Guide to Jazz Recordings wrote that Weber "splits the album between bass soliloquies and counterpoint with a chilly brass section, yet the prettiest piece on the disc is the synthesizer tune 'One Summer's Evening'."

Tyran Grillo, writing for Between Sound and Space, commented: "Orchestra is Weber at his purest. A lovely exposition of his talents, technical and melodic alike. Certainly not the one you'll want to start with, but by no means a shabby place to spend the night before continuing on your journey."

Track listing
All compositions by Eberhard Weber.
 "Seven Movements" – 12:20   
 "Broken Silence" – 1:59   
 "Before Dawn" – 5:23   
 "Just a Moment" – 2:35   
 "Air" – 4:16   
 "Ready Out There?" – 5:09   
 "Too Early to Leave" – 3:07   
 "One Summer's Evening" – 4:09   
 "A Daydream" – 3:22   
 "Trio" – 3:58   
 "Epilogue" – 4:01

Personnel
Eberhard Weber – double bass, percussion, keyboards
Herbert Joos, Anton Jillich – fluegelhorn
Rudolf Diebetsberger, Thomas Hauschild – French horn
Wolfgang Czelustra, Andreas Richter – trombone
Winfried Rapp – bass trombone
Franz Stagl – tuba

References

ECM Records albums
Eberhard Weber albums
1988 albums
Albums produced by Manfred Eicher